Eleutério Martins is a Brazilian former professional tennis player. He also goes by the name "Chipanza".

Martins, raised in Porto Alegre, was a collegiate tennis player for Mississippi State University, where he was twice named All-SEC. He was active on the professional tour during the 1980s, featuring regularly on the ATP Challenger Tour. In 1987 he won an ATP Challenger doubles title in São Paulo. His best ranking in singles was 171 in the world.

ATP Challenger titles

Doubles: (1)

References

External links
 
 

Year of birth missing (living people)
Living people
Brazilian male tennis players
Mississippi State Bulldogs tennis players
Sportspeople from Porto Alegre